The 2021 College World Series was the final stage of the 2021 NCAA Division I baseball tournament held from June 19–30 at TD Ameritrade Park Omaha. This marked the 74th edition of the College World Series and 71st time the event is being held in Omaha, Nebraska, after the 2020 tournament was canceled due to the COVID-19 pandemic in the United States.

The tournament featured eight teams in two double-elimination brackets with the two winners meeting in a best-of-three championship series.

Background 
The 2021 tournament ends the one-year hiatus left by the cancellation of the 2020 tournament due to the COVID-19 pandemic in the United States. Originally, the National Collegiate Athletic Association announced that attendance at championship events would be restricted for all spring sports, including this year's CWS at TD Ameritrade Park Omaha, to 50% due to the ongoing pandemic, meaning just 12,000 spectators per game. However, on May 19, the NCAA announced that public health authorities would be in charge of placing restrictions on the baseball and softball championships. College World Series officials stated that crowds would return to full capacity.

Participants

Bracket 
Seeds listed below indicate national seeds only

Bracket 1

Bracket 2

Finals

Game 1

Game 2

Game 3

Composite line score 
2021 College World Series Finals (2–1): Mississippi State wins.

All-Tournament Team
The following players were members of the College World Series All-Tournament Team.

Notes

References

External links 
 NCAA Baseball Championship Information

2021
2021 in baseball
2021 in sports in Nebraska
2021 NCAA Division I baseball tournament
2021 College World Series
2021 College World Series
June 2021 sports events in the United States